Sector-17 or Sector-17 Plaza is a retail and entertainment hub in Chandigarh. It is a tree-lined pedestrian plaza with fountains and stores.

History
Sector-17 was constructed at the same time when the city of Chandigarh was built. It was turned into a retail hub after the emergence of three theatres (Neelam, Jagat, KC), offices, Parade Ground, the Inter State Bus Terminus, general post office and many open spaces.

Facilities
Sector-17 is also called Chandigarh's heart. No vehicles are allowed at the plaza, instead there is a multilevel parking lot to park vehicles. The plaza has a fountain. It is a no-vending zone.

See also
 List of tourist attractions in Chandigarh

References

Chandigarh district
Tourist attractions in Chandigarh